Miffy and Friends is a stop-motion animated television series, based on the Miffy book series by Dutch artist Dick Bruna. The series was produced by Big Tent Entertainment and Mercis BV in association with Palm Multimedia.

Miffy and Friends was originally broadcast from 2003 until 2007 on KRO in the Netherlands and on CITV in the UK. In the US, it aired on Noggin. Noggin created original "interactive game" shorts to air between segments of Miffy and Friends.

Plot
The show focuses on the life of a young rabbit Miffy. The show is presented in a storybook style, with narration by Canadian actress/singer Cyd Vandenberg explaining the actions of non-speaking Miffy and her friends.

Characters
Miffy is a young rabbit and the series' protagonist. She is an aspiring artist who also likes to write.
Snuffy is a brave brown dog who was first introduced in the episode Miffy Meets Snuffy. She is one of Miffy's best friends.
Boris is a bear who lives near Miffy. He enjoys building things. He has a sister named Barbara.
Poppy is a pig often seen gardening or reading. She has a niece named Grunty.
Grunty is Poppy Pig's niece.
Barbara is Boris Bear's sister.

Episodes
The series lasted for three seasons, consisting of 39 episodes. Each episode is made up of two segments. On Noggin, original math-based shorts aired between the two segments.

Season 1 (2003–2004)
Miffy's Musical Day/Miffy's Rainy Day
Miffy Meets Snuffy/Miffy's Gift from Boris
Poppy Pig Lends a Hand/Miffy's and Aggie's Teddy Bears
Miffy at a Costume Party/Miffy Goes Camping
Snuffy's Birthday/Miffy Has the Flu
Miffy Finds the Cup/Snuffy Learns Patience
Miffy's Birthday Party/Miffy's Dancing Lessons
Miffy is Lost in the Woods/Miffy and Poppy Pig Have Breakfast
Miffy and the Little Bird/Miffy Plays Hide and Seek
Miffy and the Wall Paintings/Miffy and the Blue Egg
Miffy and the Snow Bunny/Miffy Flies a Kite
Miffy and Melanie Learn to Read/Miffy Paints Her Room
Boris's Bird House/Miffy's Three Wishes

Season 2 (2004–2005)
Miffy's Summer Vacation/Miffy Gets a Postcard
Miffy and Barbara in the Rain/Miffy Lost at the Beach
Miffy and the Caterpillar/Miffy and the Great Carrot Feast
Miffy's Colorful World/Miffy's Scooter
Miffy's Snowfall/Miffy and Grunty Sleep in a Tent
Miffy's Restaurant/Miffy Discovers Nature
Miffy and the Birthday Cake/Miffy Counts Leaves
Miffy in the Wind/Miffy's Late for School
Miffy Worries about Snuffy/Miffy Helps Grunty
Miffy Plants a Seed/Snuffy's Doghouse
Miffy Finds Snuffy/Miffy and the Seasons
Miffy Makes and Bakes/Miffy's Surprise
Miffy in the Shade/Miffy's Flower Pot

Season 3 (2005–2007)
Miffy's Beach Picnic/Boris Tidies Up!
Miffy Wants to Fly/Miffy's Teddy Bear is Sick
Miffy's Ball Game/Miffy Has an Unexpected Day
Miffy's Apple Pie/Miffy's Musical Soup
Miffy and Snuffy at the Playground/Miffy and the Hungry Bird
Miffy's Lost Teddy Bear/Miffy and the Great Summer Picnic
Miffy and the Three Christmas Trees/Miffy's Mystery
Miffy and the Shadows/Snuffy's Winter Fun
Miffy Plays Doctor/Miffy Goes Skiing
Miffy's Family Car Trip/Miffy and the Falling Leaves
Miffy and Snuffy Hear a Strange Sound/Miffy's Mother's Day Present
Boris Forgets Something/Miffy's Dance Show
Miffy Counts the Trees/Boris's Race

Production
Production took place in the Netherlands. Big Tent Entertainment and Mercis BV produced the series in association with Palm Multimedia.

Telecast and home media
Miffy and Friends was first introduced on the Dutch KRO in 2003 until it ended in 2007. The show made its world premiere on CITV in the UK. It aired on Noggin
in the U.S. until 2007. Some PBS stations had aired on repeats in the late 2000s. It also aired on Treehouse TV in Canada, on ABC Kids in Australia and on TV3 in New Zealand.

During its run, several videotapes including episodes of the series were produced. The series was also made available on DVD in America through Sony Wonder and Big Tent Entertainment. Select Miffy and Friends episodes were included on themed DVDs released in 2009. In 2016, it was also available for streaming on the Noggin app.

In 2022, Miffy and Friends was made available to stream on Amazon Prime.

Sequel
In 2015, a continuation of the series, Miffy's Adventures Big and Small, premiered on NPO Zappelin in the Netherlands and on Tiny Pop in the UK; it concluded on June 15, 2019.

References

External links

Miffy and Friends on TVGuide.com
Miffy and Friends on CommonSenseMedia.org

2000s Dutch television series
2003 Dutch television series debuts
2007 Dutch television series endings
Dutch-language television shows
English-language television shows
Treehouse TV original programming
Animated preschool education television series
2000s British animated television series
2000s British children's television series
2000s preschool education television series
2003 British television series debuts
2007 British television series endings
Animated television series about children
Animated television series about rabbits and hares
Television shows based on children's books
Television shows based on Dutch novels
British children's animated television shows